ESMT may refer to:

 Ecole Supérieure Multinationale des Télécommunications, Senegal
 European School of Management and Technology, Germany
 Halmstad Airport (ICAO code: ESMT), Halland County, Sweden